Kathleen Kelly may refer to:

 Kathleen Kelly (conductor), American conductor, coach, and pianist
 Kathleen Kelly (biologist), American biologist
 Kathleen Kelly (actress) (1912–?), British stage and film actress
 Kathleen S. Kelly, American public relations theorist and academic administrator
 Katie Kelly (born 1987), American-Canadian soccer player and manager
 Katie Kelly (paratriathlete) (born 1975), Australian paratriathlete